The Federation of Resistance Societies of the Spanish Region (FSORE) was an anarchist workers' federation founded in 1900 and extinguished in 1907, when it was succeeded by Solidaridad Obrera. It was also called New FTRE, as it was also the successor to the Federation of Workers of the Spanish Region.

History 
After the dissolution of the Union and Solidarity Pact, several attempts were made to rebuild an organization that would bring together the various Spanish labor organizations. Among these, in Haro the manifesto of December 21, 1899 of the International Worker, on January 24, 1900 in Manlleu the manifesto of the Comarcal del Ter, and finally, in mid-1900 the society of bricklayers El Porvenir summoned a Congress in Madrid. It was held from October 13 to 15 of that year, with the assistance of some 150 workers' societies, representing more than 50,000 members. There the denomination of the Federation was approved, which was also called "New FTRE".

Its statutes were of unequivocal anarchist content. At its second congress held in Madrid in 1901, convened by its secretary Francisco Soler, 73,000 members were represented, and the general strike was adopted as the most suitable method for workers' emancipation.

In its third congress, held in Madrid between May 14 and 16, 1903, 30 delegates participated representing some 100 workers' societies; secular education was approved, the moderation of the strike and the practice of solidarity was recommended. At the fourth congress, held in Seville between May 15 and 18, 1904, it was agreed to repudiate the political media, ratifying the general strike as a method; participation was significantly lower. The fifth congress returned to Madrid, and took place between May 16 and 19, 1905, it was a failure, anticipating a sixth congress in La Coruña, which was never held. It only got to publish a bulletin in this city, at the beginning of 1906, before dissolving.

One of the most demanded demands by this federation was the obtaining of the 8-hour working day; in addition to direct action against the State and employers, and the defense of the general strike. In Andalusia it had its most preponderant performance during the wave of rural strikes of 1902. It also participated in strikes in cities such as Gijón, La Coruña, Seville and Barcelona between 1901 and 1902.

After a few years of weakening of the activity of the labor movement in general, and after the disappearance of the FSORE, between 1907 and 1908 Solidaridad Obrera emerged as a successor.

References

Bibliography 

1900 establishments in Spain
1907 disestablishments in Spain
Anarchist organisations in Spain
Anarchist Federations
Syndicalist trade unions
Trade unions in Spain